is a Japanese adult visual novel developed by Circus which was first released on May 26, 2006 for Windows computers. It is a part of the ongoing Da Capo series of games by Circus, and is the direct sequel to Circus' previous title Da Capo released in 2002. A fan disc, Da Capo II: Spring Celebration, was released on April 27, 2007 and features springtime stories set after the endings for each of the six Da Capo II heroines. An all-ages consumer port titled Da Capo II: Plus Situation containing additional scenarios was released for the PlayStation 2 in May 2008. The PlayStation 2 version was later ported to PC, titled Da Capo II: Plus Communication and containing the hentai scenes found in the original release, in December 2008.

There have been many drama CDs, and two separate sets of novels and manga created based on the original game. An anime adaptation aired in Japan between October and December 2007 on TV Aichi, and was also broadcast on other networks as well. A second season of the anime aired between April and June 2008; each anime season contained thirteen episodes and were produced by Feel. A sequel set 20 years after the end of Da Capo II, Da Capo III, was released on April 27, 2012.

Gameplay
The gameplay in Da Capo II utilizes the same system  used in Da Capo, in which little interaction is required from the player as most of the duration of the game is spent on simply reading the text that will appear on the screen; this text represents either dialogue between the various characters, or the inner thoughts of the protagonist. Every so often, the player will come to a "decision point" where he or she is given the chance to choose from options that are displayed on the screen, typically two to three at a time. During these times, gameplay pauses until a choice is made that furthers the plot in a specific direction, depending on which choice the player makes. The consequences of these decisions varies, in which they may either affect the protagonist, Yoshiyuki's action, or his location. At the beginning of the gameplay, the player will mostly be given choices based on the protagonist's actions, but is soon introduced to choices based on locations and the alarm clock. Choices based on locations are accompanied by an image of a heroine, to allow the choices to be easier. The player may also adjust the protagonist's alarm clock, determining the events which occurs the following morning in the game.

There are six main plot lines that the player will have the chance to experience, one for each of the heroines in the story. In order to view the six plot lines to their entirety, the player will have to replay the game multiple times and choose different choices during the decision points in order to further the plot in an alternate direction.  The game is split into three main parts: the first story arc revolves around an upcoming Christmas party, the second arc takes place during the winter holiday break, and the last arc is back at school in the new year.

Plot

Da Capo II takes place 53 years after the events of Da Capo, when Sakura Yoshino, weary of being alone for so long, wished upon a prototype artificial wish-granting magical cherry tree for a son—Yoshiyuki Sakurai. In the first arc, while Yoshiyuki attends Kazami Academy, beneath the school, he awakens Minatsu Amakase, a robot. Yoshiyuki helps her adapt to a life with humans despite robots being nothing more than mere tools. In the second arc, Yoshiyuki begins to harbor feelings for his stepsisters, Otome and Yume, the granddaughters of Jun'ichi and Nemu. However, the cherry tree starts malfunctioning, granting all wishes, regardless of how impure, which is causing numerous incidents to occur in Hatsune. The situation gradually worsens and Otome has to choose whether or not to wither the cherry tree, which would erase Yoshiyuki's existence in the process, so as to save Hatsune.

The game centers on  the same island as Da Capo from the original story. Yoshiyuki Sakurai is the protagonist of the game. Sakura and Jun'ichi are the only returning characters, and Nemu is the only other Da Capo character to be mentioned by name. Moe, Mako, Kotori, Miharu, and Yoriko are also mentioned, but indirectly. Yume, Nanaka, Minatsu, and Sakura's themes are remixes of themes from previous Circus games. Yume, Minatsu, and Sakura's are remixes of Nemu, Miharu, and Sakura's from Da Capo, and Nanaka's is a remix of Sayaka's from Suika.

Development
Da Capo II was Circus' twenty-ninth game, but was the eleventh game developed by the development group Circus Northern who had also produced their second title Suika and their fourth title Da Capo. The game's production was headed by Tororo, president of Circus, who also worked on the game's music with Comet Nekono who worked on the game's background music. The scenario in the game was divided between five people who worked on the different stories for the heroines who include Kōta Takeuchi who mainly worked on Minatsu's and Anzu's stories, the director of the project Chihare Ameno who wrote most of Otome's and Yume's scenarios, Mochizuki JET who wrote Nanaka's and Koko's stories, Nonoka Maihama as a scenario assistant, and Mori no Me. Initial character design was mainly created by Natsuki Tanihara, but GotoP designed Sakura's pet dog Harimao. Using Tanihara's designs, five more artists in addition to Tanihara illustrated the characters and settings used in the game; these artists include Mochi Chinochi, Mitsumamu, Yuka Kayura, Eko, and Meikai. Tanihara designed Yume, Minatsu, and Sakura; Chinochi designed Nanaka, Koko, and the supporting cast; Mitsumamu designed Anzu; and Kayura designed Otome.

Release history
On April 15, 2007, a free game demo of Da Capo II titled  became available for download at Da Capo IIs official website. The demo was a prologue to the story in Da Capo II. The full game was first introduced to the public in Japan as a limited edition version on May 26, 2006 as a DVD playable on a Microsoft Windows PC. The regular edition followed on June 23, 2006. A limited edition CD-ROM version of the game was released on July 7, 2006 A version compatible with the Windows Vista operating system for the PC was released on June 29, 2007. A "gratitude pack" edition of Da Capo II was released on January 25, 2008.

A version for the PlayStation 2 under the title  was released on May 29, 2008 in limited and regular editions. The PS2 version promoted three of the former supporting characters—Maya Sawai, Akane Hanasaki, and Mayuki Kōsaka—to become obtainable heroines, along with the introduction of three original heroines—Erika Murasaki, Mahiru Takanashi, and Aishia. An adult fan disc titled  was released by Circus for the PC as a limited edition DVD on December 22, 2006, and as a regular edition on January 1, 2007. The simplified gameplay in the fan disc allows the player to select the story they would like to see from the onset. A sequel to Christmas Days for the PC titled  was released on July 25, 2008. The PlayStation 2 version was later re-released for the PC, titled Da Capo II: Plus Communication and containing the hentai scenes found in the original release, on December 26, 2008. Bundled with Da Capo, the game was released as a PlayStation Portable version titled  on October 28, 2010.

Another adult fan disc based on the Da Capo II visual novel titled  was released by Circus on April 27, 2007 playable as a DVD on the PC in limited and regular editions. Spring Celebration features springtime stories set after the endings for each of the six Da Capo II heroines. The simplified gameplay in the sequel allows the player to select which of the heroines' stories will be played through from the onset. An adult spin-off title called  was released by Circus on February 29, 2008 as a limited edition DVD, and on March 28, 2008 as a regular edition. Two DVD Players Game versions will be released separately covering the heroines Otome and Nanaka on July 25, 2008 and September 26, 2008.

Da Capo II: To You, released in June 2009, largely consists of prequel stories to the Da Capo II main story, such as Otome's and Yume's younger years, including the times when their mother, Yuki, was still alive, and Mahiru's backstory of when she was still alive. Another fandisc, titled Da Capo II: Fall in Love, was released on December 18, 2009, featuring after stories for the heroines included in the PS2 port and its Plus Communication release. The final Da Capo II release was Da Capo II: Dearest Marriage, which features Yoshiyuki and Otome in their marriage life. An English version of the original visual novel was published by the European company MangaGamer on December 24, 2010.

Adaptations
Drama CDs
There have been many drama CDs for Da Capo II. The first, titled D.C.II prestorys entrata, was written by Chihare Ameno, the director and one of the main scenario writers from the original game, and was released on February 24, 2006. A second drama CD, called , was written by Kōta Takeuchi, another one of the scenario writers for the original game, and was released almost a year later on February 10, 2007. A third drama CD, under the name , was not released in stores, but instead given out to those who had already signed previously signed up for the Circus fan club in mid 2007. A CD titled  was released for the anime's second season on May 21, 2008 by Lantis.

Internet radio shows
An Internet radio show for Da Capo II called . The show, produced by Lantis Web Radio, had a pre-broadcast on March 27, 2006, and officially aired between April 3, 2006 and September 24, 2007. The program aired every Monday at midnight featuring Ai Hinaki, Hijiri Kinomi, and Aya Tachibana who voiced Otome, Yume, and Koko in the original game, respectively. A second Internet radio show began on October 1, 2007 called D.C.toEF Radio produced by Onsen. The show airs every Monday and is hosted by Hinaki, Kinomi, and Tachibana. A third Internet radio show titled  started on November 2, 2007 produced by Animate. The show is aired every Friday and is for the first twenty-seven broadcasts was hosted by Shintarō Asanuma and Yoshino Nanjō who voiced Yoshiyuki and Koko in the anime, but starting with the twenty-sixth broadcast on May 2, 2008, Ayahi Takagaki who voices Otome in the anime joined Asanuma as his co-host.<ref>{{cite web |url=http://www.animate.tv/digital/web_radio/detail_115.html |title='Radio Da Capo II: Hatsunejima Nikki official website |publisher=Animate |access-date=July 12, 2008 |language=ja |url-status=dead |archive-url=https://web.archive.org/web/20080621111325/http://www.animate.tv/digital/web_radio/detail_115.html |archive-date=June 21, 2008 }}</ref>

Novels
There have been two separate novel series written based on Da Capo II, both published by Paradigm. The first series contained two novels that were written by Circus staff members; the first was released on May 12, 2006, and the second on June 25, 2007. The second series is written by Tasuku Saika and seven volumes were produced between November 24, 2006 and October 11, 2007. Each of the novels covers the story for one of the six heroines, except for the last two volumes which both cover Otome's story.

Manga

There have been two separate manga series created based on Da Capo II. The first, illustrated by Syo Ryuga, was serialized from December 2006 to October 2009 issues of Kadokawa Shoten's Comptiq magazine. It was collected into five bound volumes published under Kadokawa Shoten's Kadokawa Comics Ace imprint. The second manga series, illustrated by Tsukasa Uhaha, was serialized in ASCII Media Works' Dengeki G's Magazine between the March 2007 and May 2009 issues under the title . The fifth and final bound volumes will be published for Da Capo II: Imaginary Future under ASCII Media Works' Dengeki Comics imprint on June 27, 2009. A special chapter of Da Capo II: Imaginary Future was serialized in the July 2008 issue of Comptiq sold on June 10, 2008.

Anime

On May 10, 2007, the magazine Comptiq revealed that a Da Capo II anime adaptation would be produced. The anime aired in Japan between October 1, 2007 and December 24, 2007 on TV Aichi, and was broadcast on other networks soon after, including Chiba TV and TV Kanagawa. A second season aired in Japan between April 5, 2008 and June 28, 2008 on the same networks as the first season. Each season was produced by the animation studio Feel, and contains thirteen episodes.

Music
A CD single containing the main opening and ending themes of Da Capo II was released on June 7, 2006 by Lantis. The main opening theme, was sung by Yozuca*, and the main ending theme, "Spring has come", was sung by Rino. There were two other opening themes: "Beautiful flower" was sung by Aki Misato, which was also used as an insert song, and "Especially" was sung by Miyuki Hashimoto. Additionally, there were four other ending themes.  was sung by Yozuca*, which was also used as another insert song, was used as the ending theme for Nanaka's route. "Little Distance" was sung by Seiko Modaka was used as the ending theme for both Anzu's and Koko's route. The third ending theme, "If...I wish", was sung by Aki Misato and was used as the ending theme for Otome's and Yume's routes. The last ending theme, was sung by twenty of the cast from the game and was used as the ending theme for Minatsu's route. The final theme song used in the game was "Time will shine" sung by Alchemy+, and was used as an insert song.

An album titled VocalAlbum Songs From D.C.II containing the theme songs was released on July 26, 2006 by Lantis. Da Capo IIs original soundtrack was released on August 23, 2006 by Lantis. A single containing the theme song for the first Internet radio show titled  was released on October 25, 2006. A character song album featuring songs sung by voice actors from the game was released on December 13, 2006 by Lantis. A maxi single containing the opening theme of Spring Celebration called "Happy my life: Thank you for everything!!" was released on May 9, 2007. A mini album for Spring Celebration containing five of the game's theme songs was released on May 23, 2007 by Lantis. A vocal album for Plus Situation was released by Lantis on June 4, 2008.

Both singles were released on October 24, 2007 by Lantis. The song  sung by Minori Chihara was used as the ending theme for the thirteenth episode of season one, and the single containing the song was released by Lantis on January 23, 2008. A best of album containing songs from the games and the anime seasons of Da Capo titled  was released by Lantis on November 21, 2007. A vocal album containing songs sung by Yozuca* and CooRie titled Dolce3 was released by Lantis on July 9, 2008. Six image song singles were released for the six main heroines featured in Da Capo II. The first two for Koko and Minatsu were released on December 26, 2007. The next two singles for Nanaka and Anzu were released on February 27, 2008. The final two singles for Yume and Otome were released on April 9, 2008 by Lantis. For the second season, the opening theme is  sung by Yozuca*, and the ending theme is  sung by CooRie. Both singles were released on April 23, 2008 by Lantis.

Reception
The original Da Capo II release was positively reviewed at visual-novels.net, commenting: "I know a lot of gamers may not enjoy Da Capo, but whilst I think the story on some arcs was weaker than on others they were still amazing paths to play. On the stronger paths you really start to feel a lot of emotion for these girls, and because they're so closely tied together, someone always gets hurt. That for me bought some realism to the game." In the October 2007 issue of Dengeki G's Magazine, poll results for the fifty best bishōjo games were released. Out of 249 titles, Da Capo II ranked seventh with forty-seven votes. Da Capo II was the most widely sold game of 2006 on Getchu.com. Da Capo II: Spring Celebration was the second most widely sold game for the first half of 2007 on Getchu.com, just behind Kimi ga Aruji de Shitsuji ga Ore de. Furthermore, Da Capo II: Spring Celebration'' was the sixth most widely sold game of 2007 on Getchu.com.

References

External links
Da Capo II official website 
Spring Celebration official website 
Plus Situation official website 
Da Capo II anime official website 
Da Capo II: Second Season anime official website 
Da Capo II: Plus Communication official website 
English version, on MangaGamer's website

2006 Japanese novels
2006 video games
2006 manga
2007 manga
2007 anime television series debuts
2008 anime television series debuts
Anime television series based on video games
ASCII Media Works manga
Bishōjo games
D.C.: Da Capo
Dengeki Comics
Dengeki G's Magazine
Eroge
Feel (animation studio)
Lantis (company)
Manga based on video games
Mass media franchises
Nomad (company)
PlayStation 2 games
PlayStation Portable games
School life in anime and manga
Seinen manga
Video games developed in Japan
Visual novels
Windows games
MangaGamer games